"Asunder" is the tenth episode of the American crime comedy-drama television series Terriers. The episode was written by Nicholas Griffin, and directed by series creator Ted Griffin. It was first broadcast on FX in the United States on November 10, 2010.

The series is set in Ocean Beach, San Diego and focuses on ex-cop and recovering alcoholic Hank Dolworth (Donal Logue) and his best friend, former criminal Britt Pollack (Michael Raymond-James), who both decide to open an unlicensed private investigation business. In the episode, Hank and Britt attend Gretchen's wedding but both face personal problems while staying at the hotel.

According to Nielsen Media Research, the episode was seen by an estimated 0.539 million household viewers and gained a 0.2/1 ratings share among adults aged 18–49. The episode received critical acclaim, with critics praising the performances, writing, and directing.

Plot
Hank (Donal Logue) continues with his Alcoholics Anonymous meetings, while Britt (Michael Raymond-James) and Katie (Laura Allen) attend the wedding of Gretchen (Kimberly Quinn) and Jason (Loren Dean). After getting his shirt ruined, Britt asks Hank for a replacement, and Hank offers to go there and give it to him.

Unbeknownst to Britt, Hank decides to stay at the hotel during the wedding reception. There, he sees that Ben Zeitlin (Michael Gaston) and Mr. Burke (Daren Scott) are staying at the hotel. He talks with Britt to inform him that he is staying and asks him to bring his tech friends to help him with a stakeout. Planting a camera in their suite, Hank and the crew find that a freelance reporter Laura Ross (Alison Elliot), who has been reporting some incriminating accusations against Zeitlin. Zeitlin wants to know the source of the accusations, which Ross refuses to disclose. Zeitlin then threatens with killing her mother.

As Gretchen and Jason get officially married, Britt talks with Katie about her pregnancy test. She lies, claiming that she isn't pregnant, although she feels disappointed when Britt expresses relief. He confronts her again for lying about the pregnancy and asks her what is happening. She whispers something into his ear, prompting him to leave the reception. She catches up to him, admitting to the affair, but not disclosing the name of the man. She then uses his remarks at the wedding to suggest that he is not ready for marriage. Britt breaks up their relationship, telling her that he will move out of the house.

Hank manages to communicate with Ross, getting her mother's address to warn her about the threat. He also calls security to take Ross out of the hotel room. He places Ross in the limo that will drive Gretchen and Jason, managing to avoid being seen by them. He then confronts Zeitlin, warning him to stay away from Ross or he will leak the recording of his threat. Zeitlin agrees to the terms, but Burke gets his payback by punching Hank in the nose. As he leaves, he finds Britt in the sidewalk. They both don't want to talk about their problems and walk away from the hotel.

Reception

Viewers
The episode was watched by 0.539 million viewers, earning a 0.2/1 in the 18-49 rating demographics on the Nielson ratings scale. This means that 0.2 percent of all households with televisions watched the episode, while 1 percent of all households watching television at that time watched it. This was a 20% decrease in viewership from the previous episode, which was watched by 0.667 million viewers with a 0.3/1 in the 18-49 rating demographics.

Critical reviews
"Asunder" received critical acclaim. Noel Murray of The A.V. Club gave the episode an "A-" grade and wrote, "The personal and the professional collide like a sonofabitch in this week's Terriers, a somewhat unusual outing for the series but one of its strongest. For the third episode in a row, Hank and Britt are separated for most of the hour, though they at least they're in roughly the same location: a San Diego luxury hotel, where Hank's ex-wife, Gretchen, is getting married. And our heroes do end the episode back together, ready to forge ahead — Hank triumphantly, and Britt with his heart and guts dangling around his shoetops." 

Alan Sepinwall of HitFix wrote, "For a show that so frequently operates on a very casual wavelength, the tension in this one was gripping, and the payoffs – particularly Britt and Hank's role reversal at the end – worth the amount of time I spent holding my breath." Matt Richenthal of TV Fanatic gave the episode a 4.7 star rating out of 5 and wrote, "Another tremendous episode of a show that gives us something different every week. Simply put, I'll be very sad if Terriers does not come back for a second season."

References

External links
 

2010 American television episodes
Terriers episodes